is a sub-kilometer asteroid and tumbling slow rotator, classified as near-Earth object and potentially hazardous asteroid of the Aten group, which orbit the Sun between Venus and Earth. Its orbital period of 0.75 years means that it orbits the sun about 4 times for every 3 of the Earth. It was discovered on 29 September 2003, by astronomers of the Lowell Observatory Near-Earth-Object Search at Anderson Mesa Station near Flagstaff, Arizona.

Earth flybys 2015–2027 

It passed about 28 lunar distances (LD) from the Earth on 25 December 2015. It came within about 7 LD (0.0189 AU) on 22 December 2018. Its peak brightness was about 13.13 magnitude on 16 December 2018.

Observations are planned for favorable flybys in 2021, 2024, and 2027. It passed with 14 LD (0.0363 AU) on 17 December 2021, and 34 LD (0.0884 AU) on 2 December 2024, and 54 LD (0.1382 AU) on 12 November 2027.

Patrick Taylor of Arecibo Observatory suggested it could be a target for a future robotic mission.

2015 
It was observed in December 2015 at a distance of 28.3 lunar distances (0.07296 AU) on December 24, and its brightest was 15.22 magnitude on December 16. It showed an elongated shape, up to 2 km wide, described as being shaped like a sweet potato.

Closest flyby 2018 
 passed its closest distance of 7.34 LD (0.01899 AU) on 22 December 2018. It was on the list of Goldstone targets for December 2018  to gain more information for the Near-Earth Object Human Space Flight Accessible Targets Study (NHATS).

Its peak brightness was about 13.1 magnitude on 16 December 2018, moving south from Ursa major and Boötes into Ophiuchus at closest approach and into Sagittarius.

2021
 passed at a distance of 14.1  lunar distances (0.03628 AU) on December 17, 2021. It was observed by the Goldstone Solar System Radar from November to December 2021.

Notes

References

External links 

 Radar Images of a Christmas-Eve Asteroid: An Early Gift for Astronomers Goldstone, JPL, December 23, 2015
 No, a "Massive" Asteroid Passing Earth on Thursday Will Not Cause Earthquakes By Phil Plait, December 21, 2015 
 Mission Opportunities for Human Exploration of Nearby Planetary Bodies Cyrus Foster, Matthew Daniels (2016)
 
 
 

163899
163899
163899
163899
Near-Earth objects in 2018
20030929